The National Museum of Language, located in College Park, Maryland, is a cultural institution established in 1997 to "examine the history, impact, and art of language," and remains one of only a handful of institutions designed for this purpose.

The museum opened officially on May 3, 2008, in College Park, MD, with an exhibition entitled "Writing Language: Passing It On." In 2014, the museum closed its physical facility and became a virtual museum. At present, it is focusing on outreach activities and virtual exhibits. Its outreach includes a speaker series (the Amelia C. Murdoch Speaker Series) and a summer World Languages camp for children. Among its current (2018) online features are a Dictionary of American Regional English (DARE) virtual exhibit, the Greek language Philogelos comic strip, regular interviews with linguistic newsmakers and a bimonthly newsletter.

The NML owns the world's only International Flag of Language, the result of a contest sponsored by the museum in 2008. The three shades of green on the flag represent past, present, and future languages. The museum is almost entirely run and staffed by volunteers.

History
The idea for a national language museum dates to 1971, when linguists at the National Security Agency put on an exhibition called "Language, Its Infinite Variety." However the idea of a language museum did not gain hold until 1985, when the linguists from the NSA exhibition met again to discuss the possibility. The linguists were unable to establish exhibits at that time, but an organizing committee was formed and a board of directors were elected in 1997. Prior to opening to the public, the museum did have a presence with a newsletter, annual dinner and occasional programs, e.g. "Creole Languages as Misunderstood and Endangered Languages” symposium in 2007.

NML opened officially on May 3, 2008, with an exhibition entitled ‘‘Writing Language: Passing It On,” which traced the roots of early alphabet languages, such as Arabic, Latin, Greek and Hebrew, and featured as well character-based Chinese and Japanese. Another noted exhibit which followed was "Emerging American Language in 1812", which explained influences on the development of American English as a separate entity from British English, and included a display about the contributions of Noah Webster, the "First American Lexicographer." Other smaller exhibits focused on Native American, Amharic, and North American French. In 2011, it displayed Bibles and liturgical manuscripts on loan from the Alphabet Museum in Waxhaw, North Carolina.

The museum housed the Allen Walker Read Library (collection of books from a noted American etymologist and lexicographer) as well as the Ann Kietzman collection of international children's books in foreign languages. The museum also taught classes on occasion. Among its programs were the creation of a speaker's series (renamed the Amelia C. Murdoch Speaker Series after the NML founder), which featured experts in various areas related to language use and history. The Museum also offered grade school programs, and ran a summer language camp. When the museum went virtual, it maintained the speaker series and the summer camp. It still maintains its book collections and displays its flag at museum events.

Funding
The NML is operated by a largely all-volunteer staff. The majority of its funding comes from donations, membership fees, and occasional government grants.

References

External links 
 National Museum of Language
 Facebook - National Museum of Language
 Wiki - National Museum of Language
 Pinterest - National Museum of Language
 LibraryThing - National Museum of Language
 Prince George's County Tourism website

Museums in Prince George's County, Maryland
Museums established in 2008
Literary museums in the United States
Society museums in the United States
College Park, Maryland
2008 establishments in Maryland
Language museums
Virtual museums